Thomas Charles Desmond (September 15, 1887 – October 6, 1972) was an American engineer and politician from New York.

Life
He was born on September 15, 1887, in Middletown, Orange County, New York, the son of Thomas Henry Desmond and Katharine (Safried) Desmond. He graduated from Harvard University in 1908, and from the Massachusetts Institute of Technology in 1909.

He was President and Chief Engineer of the Newburgh Ship Yards which built ships for the U.S. Navy, among them in 1918 the USS Newburgh.

On August 16, 1923, he married Alice B. Curtis, an author of biographies, and travel and children's books. They had no children.

He was President of The New York Young Republican Club; and a delegate to the 1928 and 1940 Republican National Conventions.

Desmond was a member of the New York State Senate from 1931 to 1958, sitting in the 154th, 155th, 156th, 157th, 158th, 159th, 160th, 161st, 162nd, 163rd, 164th, 165th, 166th, 167th, 168th, 169th, 170th and 171st New York State Legislatures; and was Chairman of the Committee on Public Printing in 1931, and of the Committee on Military Affairs in 1932.

He was a life member of the MIT Corporation, and died on October 6, 1972, in Boston, Massachusetts, while on a visit to the MIT.

In 1976, his widow Alice Curtis Desmond (1897–1990) married Hamilton Fish III (1888–1991).

Sources

1887 births
1972 deaths
Republican Party New York (state) state senators
Politicians from Newburgh, New York
Engineers from New York (state)
Harvard University alumni
Massachusetts Institute of Technology alumni
20th-century American politicians